Bacon ice cream (or bacon-and-egg ice cream) is an ice cream generally created by adding bacon to egg custard and freezing the mixture. The concept of bacon ice cream originated in a 1973 sketch on the British comedy series The Two Ronnies as a joke; it was eventually created for April Fools' Day by a New York ice cream parlour in 1982. In the 2000s, the English chef Heston Blumenthal experimented with ice cream, making a custard similar to scrambled eggs and adding bacon to create one of his signature dishes. It now appears on dessert menus in other restaurants.

Origins

Ice cream is generally expected to be a sweet food, eaten as a dessert, even though there is evidence of savoury ice creams eaten in Victorian times. Bacon ice cream originated as a joke, a flavour that no one would willingly eat, in the 1973 "Ice Cream Parlour Sketch" by The Two Ronnies, where a customer requests cheese and onion flavoured ice cream followed by smokey bacon.

In 1992, bacon-and-egg ice cream was created as an April Fools' Day experiment at Aldrich's Beef and Ice Cream Parlor in Fredonia, New York. Ten years earlier, co-owner Scott Aldrich was challenged by a gravy salesman to make beef gravy ice cream, which he did for April Fools' Day of 1982. Although it was reportedly "their most disgusting" creation, Aldrich's went on to release other unusual flavours on April Fools' Day, such as  "chocolate spaghetti ice cream" (Julia Aldrich's first of many contributions),"ketchup and mustard swirl", "pork and beans" or "sauerkraut and vanilla" in 1991. In 1992, they made  of bacon-and-egg ice cream which he gave away free to anyone who would try it. The ice creams generally received positive reviews. In 1992, The Victoria Advocate reported,Despite the disgusting names, most of [Aldrich's] prank flavors taste good, he said. Bacon and egg tastes like a slightly nutty vanilla, though the faint flavor of flaky egg yolk sometimes pushes through.In 2003 an ice cream parlour, "Udder Delight", opened in Rehoboth Beach, Delaware, specialising in "outlandish" ice cream flavours. Among other flavours, such as their award-winning peanut butter and jelly ice cream, they have created a bacon ice cream which tastes like butter pecan. The owner, Chip Hearn, had included the flavour along with 17 others in an invitation-only focus group, where the tasters were allowed to suggest changes and give opinions on the flavour.

Heston Blumenthal

The English chef Heston Blumenthal creates unusual dishes using molecular gastronomy. His restaurant, the Fat Duck in Bray, Berkshire, has won three Michelin stars among other achievements. As early as 2001, Blumenthal created savoury ice cream flavours such as mustard grain and crab. In an article explaining the concept of "flavour encapsulation", Blumenthal explained that flavour is much more intense in encapsulated bursts, rather than when dispersed in a solution; therefore, the more that eggs are cooked, the more that the proteins stick together. This creates pockets of egg flavour in the ice cream, which release as it melts in customers' mouths.

Traditional ice cream is frozen egg custard with flavours added. Blumenthal whisks egg yolks with sugar until the sugar interacts with the proteins in the yolk, creating a network of proteins. The entire substance turns white, at which point flavouring can be added and cooked in. While stirring the mixture, Blumenthal cools it as fast as possible using liquid nitrogen.

Blumenthal's bacon-and-egg ice cream, now one of his signature dishes, along with his other unique flavours, has given him a reputation as "The Wizard of Odd" and has made his restaurant a magnet for food enthusiasts. Blumenthal has stated that one ambition is to create an ice cream with flavours released in time-separated stages; for example, bacon and egg followed by orange juice or tea. Once he perfects the technique of separating the flavours, he would attempt mussels followed by chocolate.

In the 2006 New Years Honours List, Blumenthal was awarded Officer of the Most Excellent Order of the British Empire (OBE), the United Kingdom's fourth highest order of chivalry, for his services to food.

Recipes 

As bacon ice cream was created in 1992 and came to prominence in the 2000s, there is no traditional recipe. Recipes generally involve adding bacon to a standard sweet ice cream recipe, often vanilla but other suggestions include coffee, rum or pecan. The saltiness of the bacon highlights the sweetness of the ice cream. According to one Wired.com article, the bacon should be candied prior to addition, a process which involves baking the bacon in a sugar syrup. This has the benefit of sweetening the bacon, in a similar manner to pancakes in some parts of the United States.

Heston Blumenthal variation
Blumenthal's recipe uses ice cream without flavouring, but which tastes of egg. In the recipe featured in The Big Fat Duck Cookbook, the bacon is lightly roasted with the fat on, then infused in milk for 10 hours. The infused mix is precisely heated with egg and sugar to overcook the eggs, increasing the "eggy" flavour, then sieved, put through a food processor, churned and frozen. The ice cream is served with caramelised French toast, a tomato compote, a slice of pancetta hardened with maple syrup, and tea jelly.

Blumenthal has since updated his recipe to include a ten-hour period of soaking the bacon in a vacuum-packed bag prior to baking. He has also changed the presentation so that the unfrozen ice cream is injected into empty egg shells, then dramatically scrambled at the customer's table in liquid nitrogen, giving the impression of cooking.

Reception
Bacon ice cream has received a mixed reception; as a combination of sweet and savoury flavours, it was designed to be controversial. In 2004, rival chef Nico Ladenis thought the Michelin system was doing a "great disservice to the industry" by hailing Blumenthal as a genius for egg-and-bacon ice-cream, saying that originality alone should not merit a Michelin star. Blumenthal pointed out that Ladenis had never tried the aforementioned ice cream.

Trevor White has suggested that Blumenthal had latched onto a culture where diners cannot get enough of the new and are spoiled by choice, comparing the food to a "freak show". Janet Street-Porter has criticised Blumenthal's cooking as pretentious. She attempted to make his bacon-and-egg ice cream from the recipe published in his The Big Fat Duck Cookbook, altering the recipe slightly due to her hectic workload and guessing when she did not have the right tools. The result she described as nauseating and "too sickly for words".

The ice cream sparked debate in the Los Angeles Times, when food writer Noelle Carter described bacon ice cream as perfection but the health section put up a photograph of a heart bypass and the headline "Bacon ice cream. No good can come of it". The Delaware "Udder Delight" ice cream maker, Chip Hearn, who made bacon ice cream appears to have done so partly as a gimmick to get people into his shop, since he allows customers to taste any flavour in the store. He felt that his flavours differentiated him from the many other parlours on the shore and many people come in to try bacon ice cream only to buy something else.

Notable uses
Bacon ice cream has been recreated by other chefs in recent years. For example, it appears on the menu at Espai Sucre in Barcelona, a restaurant that specialises in desserts, with descriptions such as "innovative" and "spectacular". In the United States, bacon was one of the themes for dessert at the Fancy food show. In 2006, two separate contestants created versions of bacon ice cream in the reality series Top Chef. Celebrity chef Bob Blumer won a Texas ice cream making competition with a bacon ice cream. Originally planning to use candied bacon, he changed at the last moment to do a bacon brittle ice cream. Chef Michael Symon made bacon ice cream in the first season of the Food Network's The Next Iron Chef competition. Andrew Knowlton, a judge, dismissed it as not original. But Symon managed to progress in the competition and eventually win. Burger King rolled out a "bacon sundae", vanilla ice cream with caramel, chocolate, bacon bits, and one strip of bacon, in the summer of 2012 in the US. It was tested in Nashville in April.

See also

 List of bacon dishes
 List of ice cream flavors
 Beer ice cream
 Chocolate-covered bacon
 Bacon mania
 2010s in food

References

Flavors of ice cream
Bacon dishes
2010s in food